Provincial road N224 is a Dutch provincial road.

See also

References

External links

224
224
224